Fanny Cadeo (born 11 September 1970) is an Italian actress, television personality, singer, and model.
She achieved her first success in 1992 when she was one of the first showgirls to appear in Striscia la notizia and remained with the show until 1994. Since 2013, she has been the presenter of the Rai Due television show Il Cercasapori.

Cadeo has a daughter born in 2014 from her relationship with an Italian businessman, Stefano Caviglia.

Biography 

Before entering show business, she graduated in languages at Liceo Lingiustico Santa Marta in Chiavari and participated in several singing lessons, dance and modern jazz. She made her television debut as a velina presenting Striscia la notizia (1992 and 1994).

She has also performed several songs, such as a cover of "Mambo italiano" (1993), "I want your love" (1994) and "Living in the Night" (2000).

In 1995 she landed a leading role in the film Trinita & Bambino ... e adesso tocca a noi!. In 2003 she was in the cast of Buona Domenica.

In 2012 she  played Portia in the stage production of Shakespeare's The Merchant of Venice directed by Andrea Buscemi. From 2012 to 2014 she worked for Rai Radio 1 on the program L'Italia che va with Daniel Della Seta.

Works

Theatre 

 Gocce di luna - directed by Armando Marra
 Passerelle with Platinette - directed by Mino Bellei
 Sex and City - directed by Fabio Crisafi
 Arrivederci e grazie (monologues) with Manuela Kustermann - directed by Giancarlo Nanni
 Portami tante rose.it with Valeria Valeri - directed by Marco Mattolini
 Rimanga tra noi with Antonio Giuliani - directed by Antonio Giuliani
 Mi ritorni in mente with Franco Oppini - directed by Renato Giordano
 Il mercante di Venezia by William Shakespeare in the role of Porzia, with A. Buscemi directed by di A. Buscemi

Discografia 

 1993 - Another Chance
 1993 - Mambo Italiano
 1994 - I Want Your Love
 1994 - Pecame
 1995 - I Want Your Love Remix
 2000 - Living In The Night

Cinema 

 Trinità & Bambino... e adesso tocca a noi, directed by E.B. Clucher (1995)
 Croce e delizia,  directed by Luciano De Crescenzo (1995)
 Gli inaffidabili, directed by Jerry Calà (1997)
 Una milanese a Roma, directed by Diego Febbraro (2001)
 Fatti della banda della Magliana, directed by Daniele Costantini (2005)
 Cose da pazzi, directed by Vincenzo Salemme (2005)
 Troppo belli, directed by Ugo Fabrizio Giordani (2005)

TV - Fiction 
           
 Racket -  directed by Luigi Perelli
 Agenzia fantasma -   directed by Vittorio De Sisti
 Tutti gli uomini sono uguali -  directed by Alessandro Capone
 Un posto al sole (guest star, in some episodes) - RAI 3
 La Squadra (guest star) RAI 3
 Il Grande Torino - directed by Claudio Bonivento
 Domani - regia di Vincenzo Terracciano
 Condominio sit-com  in  Buona Domenica (with Claudio Lippi and Laura Freddi)  - directed by Beppe Recchia
 Io e mamma with Stefania e Amanda Sandrelli -  directed by Andrea Barzini

TV - Programmi 

 Striscia la notizia - edizione 1994
 Maurizio Costanzo Show
 Tappeto Volante
 Quelli che il calcio.
 Raffaella (TVE)
 Gran fiesta Italiana (Telecinco)
 Eurot (Chanel 4)
 Thomas G. Show (Germania)
 Primatist Trophy presenter for Odeon TV 
 Donne e viaggi Rete 4
 Ci vediamo su Raiuno with Paolo Limiti
 Uno Mattina Raiuno (special broadcast)
 Stupido Hotel Raidue
 Buona Domenica Canale 5
 SOS notte (presenter) Alice home tv
 Follie rotolanti (presenter) Raidue (2008)
 Venice Music Award  (Raidue) 2009
 Cercasapori (presenter) (Raidue) 2009-2010
 Premio Mogol (Aosta)  Raiuno (2010)
 10 Stelle per Madre Teresa Raiuno, 2010
 L’Anno che verrà Raiuno Concerto do Capodanno 2011 a Rimini (2 canzoni)
 Torino Film Festival Rai Movie presenter
 Lasciatemi cantare Raiuno with Carlo Conti
 Quello che le donne (non) dicono (guest) (2015) - Agon Channel

Radio programs 

 Programma musicale anni ’60 – ’80. Author and presenter - Isoradio 
 Il Cercasapori-SMS consumatori. Presenter - Isoradio
 Grazie dei fiori. Presenter - Isoradio
 L’Italia che va con Daniel della Seta.  Presenter - Radio 1

See also

References

External links 

 
 

1970 births
20th-century Italian actresses
21st-century Italian actresses
Italian showgirls
Italian stage actresses
Living people